Chydeniusfjella is a mountain group in the Ny-Friesland region of Spitsbergen in the Svalbard archipelago. It is named after Finnish physicist Jakob Karl Emil Chydenius.

The mountain group is located between Wijdefjorden and Hinlopen Strait, and is surrounded by the glaciers of Ermakbreen, Harlandisen, Veteranen, Glasgowbreen and Kvitbreen. The group includes Newtontoppen, the highest peak in Svarlbad at 1,713 metres.

References

Mountains of Spitsbergen